Scotland Women v England Women (1972) was the first ever official international women's football match to be played in Great Britain. It was contested by the national teams of Scotland and England. The match took place on 18 November 1972 at Ravenscraig Stadium in Greenock, Scotland. England won the game 3–2, almost exactly a hundred years after the first men's international between the two nations. It was the second international women's match to be granted official status by FIFA, after a meeting between France and Netherlands in April 1971.

Background

Representative women's fixtures between teams from Scotland and England had taken place much earlier. In May 1881 a touring English team played two fixtures against local opposition in Edinburgh and Glasgow. The second game, before 5,000 spectators at Shawfield Stadium, resulted in a riot. In March 1918 Celtic Park hosted a match between female teams of munitions workers. Vickers-Armstrongs from Barrow, beat William Beardmore and Company from Glasgow 4–0, with proceeds donated to hospitals caring for wounded soldiers from World War I. A return fixture in Barrow three weeks later finished 2–2, in front of 5,000 fans. In 1920 Dick, Kerr's Ladies beat a Scottish XI 22–0. A return fixture at Celtic Park the following year finished 9–0 to the English team, watched by a crowd of 6,000. Dick, Kerr's then undertook a tour of Scotland; playing in Edinburgh, Kilmarnock, Aberdeen, Dundee and Dumfries to an aggregate crowd of 70,000. The SFA was resisting pressure from UEFA to take over the administration of women's football. In 1971 the European member associations had voted 39–1 in favour of UEFA's motion that they take control of women's football, with Scotland voting against. In Scotland football was traditionally seen as a working class, male preserve. A 1921 ban on women's football was not lifted until 1974 and it was not until 1998 that the SFA assumed ultimate responsibility for Scottish women's football.

Teams
England's defensive midfielder was 17-year-old Janet Bagguley of Macclesfield Ladies, described by Wendy Owen as "hard as nails and a ferocious tackler". Team captain Sheila Parker (née Porter) was a 24-year-old centre half.

Background
Wendy Owen reported that the hotel in Gourock where England stayed required its female guests to wear skirts at all times: "this didn't go down too well with the players, most of whom, like me, were never out of trousers. I didn't even possess a dress or skirt and had to go out and buy one before I joined the tour."

Venue

The match was staged in Greenock at Ravenscraig Stadium, primarily an athletics facility, because a Scottish Football Association (SFA) resolution dating from the 1920s was still in place. This banned women footballers from SFA-affiliated grounds. For the same reason the referee and linesmen were sourced from the Scottish Football Referees Association instead of via the SFA. The English FA had rescinded their own similar ban in January 1970.

The match
Wendy Owen was "bitterly disappointed" to be named amongst the substitutes and watched the game from underneath a blanket on the substitute's bench. The match was played in icy conditions which gave way to heavy snow during the second half. Sylvia Gore recalled that: "There was only one other game played in Scotland that day – a men's game – because the conditions were so bad." A "close and exciting" game saw Scotland leading 2–1 at half time but England recovering to win 3–2. Scotland took the lead with a goal from Mary Carr. Rose Reilly then scored direct from a corner to put Scotland 2–0 ahead. During the first half Gore made history by scoring England's first ever goal in an official international:

As conditions deteriorated in the second half, England scored twice more without reply. Wendy Owen reported that Gore scored again and Pat Davies got one, while Sue Lopez credited Davies with both England's second half goals.

Match details

Subsequent matches

England has competed against Scotland most notably since 1972 in matches in 2019 FIFA World Cup and Euro 2017.

Record
The full record between the two countries is as follows:

References

Bibliography

External links 
 
 The English Football Association

November 1972 sports events in the United Kingdom
1971–72 in English women's football
1971–72 in Scottish women's football
Greenock
Association football matches in Scotland
England women's national football team matches
Scotland women's national football team matches